Jörg Breu the Elder (c. 1475–1537), of Augsburg, was a painter of the German Danube school. He was the son of a weaver.

He journeyed to Austria and created several multi-panel altarpieces there in 1500–02, such as the Melk Abbey altar (1502). He returned to Augsburg in 1502, where he became a master. He travelled to Italy twice, in ca. 1508 and in 1514/15.

After his death in 1537, his son, Jörg Breu the Younger continued to lead his Augsburg workshop until his own death 10 years later.

References

External links

Jörg Breu the Elder at the J. Paul Getty Museum

1470s births
1537 deaths
15th-century German painters
German male painters
16th-century German painters
German Renaissance painters
Artists from Augsburg